Josip Runjanin (8 December 1821 – 2 February 1878) was a Croatian Serb soldier and composer from the Austrian Empire best known for composing the melody of Lijepa naša domovino, which later became the Croatian national anthem.

Life
Runjanin was born Josif Runjanin to a Serb family on 8 December 1821 and baptized in the Serbian Orthodox Church of Pentecost in Vinkovci. He received his education in Vinkovci, and then Sremski Karlovci. He served in the Imperial Army as a cadet in the town of Glina along the Military Frontier in the Croatian Military Frontier district.

While serving in Glina, he attained the rank of captain, and became proficient in playing the piano, being taught by the military bandmaster of Glina. There, he was introduced to the Illyrist circles, where he met noted poet Antun Mihanović. It is generally agreed that Runjanin, an amateur musician, composed the music for Mihanović's patriotic Croatian poem "Horvatska domovina" in 1846 using inspiration from Gaetano Donizetti's aria "O sole piu ratto a sorger t'appresta" from the third act of his opera Lucia di Lammermoor, according to Croatian musicologist Josip Andreis.

His song "Ljubimo te naša diko" was composed using motives from Donizetti's L'elisir d'amore. "Ljubimo te naša diko (Hrvati svome banu)" was composed in honour of the Ban of Croatia, Josip Jelačić.

The Croatian anthem by Mihanović and Runjanin would be first played in the streets of Zagreb in 1891 during the Croatian-Slavonian exhibit, so both men only achieved postmortem fame. An obedient soldier, Runjanin was later made colonel.

In 1864 at the age of 43, Runjanin married the daughter of the pensioned captain Toma Perković. As a representative of the First Banate regiment, he entered the Croatian Assembly in 1865.

After retirement, Runjanin moved to Novi Sad where he died at the age of 57 on 2 February 1878 and was buried at the Serbian Orthodox cemetery.

Legacy 

There are several schools in Croatia named after Runjanin, most notably the Elementary Music School of Josip Runjanin (Osnovna glazbena škola Josipa Runjanina) in Vinkovci.

Notes

References

External links 
 

1821 births
1878 deaths
19th-century composers
19th-century male musicians
Austro-Hungarian Serbs
Croatian composers
Male composers
National anthem writers
Musicians from Novi Sad
People from Vinkovci
Serbian composers
Serbs of Croatia